René Alphonse Lemoine (29 December 1905 – 19 December 1995) was a French fencer. He won a gold medal in the team foil event at the 1932 Summer Olympics and a silver in the same event at the 1936 Summer Olympics.

At the world championships, official and unofficial, Lemoine won an individual gold in 1931 and a bronze in 1937. He also won team silver medals in 1930, 1934, 1935 and 1937. 

Lemoine was the son of a general manager of Peugeot and was trained in mathematics and law. After briefly studying in Chad, he went to Equatorial Africa in 1938 and became a coffee farmer and exporter of colonial goods. During World War II, he headed the civil and military resistance in Central African Republic and supported French forces of Charles de Gaulle. In 1940, he was jailed by the Vichy authorities, but released after 1.5 months. He then fought in Madagascar and Northern Africa. After the war Lemoine resumed trading agricultural products. He was made an Officer of the Legion of Honour and was awarded the Croix de Guerre, among other military decorations. Until 1981 he served as a French representative for the Central High Council of French Abroad.

References

External links
 

1905 births
1995 deaths
French male foil fencers
Olympic fencers of France
Fencers at the 1932 Summer Olympics
Fencers at the 1936 Summer Olympics
Olympic gold medalists for France
Olympic silver medalists for France
Olympic medalists in fencing
Medalists at the 1932 Summer Olympics
Medalists at the 1936 Summer Olympics
20th-century French people